Sisto Gillarduzzi (6 September 1908 - 29 November 1989) was a bobsladder and an alpine ski racer from Italy who won a silver medal in the bobsleigh at the FIBT World Championships (1937) and participated in the alpine skiing to one edition of the Alpine World Ski Championships (1933).

A family of bobsledders
Brother of two other bobsledders, as him from Cortina d'Ampezzo, Uberto and Guido.

Achievements

Alpine Ski

World Championships results

National titles
Italian Alpine Ski Championships
Downhill: 1933

References

External links
 Gillarduzzi "de Rosina" Sisto - BOB SU PISTA

1908 births
1989 deaths
Italian male alpine skiers
Italian male bobsledders